The Little Menominee River is a  tributary of the Upper Mississippi River, which it joins in Jo Daviess County, Illinois.

The Little Menominee rises in Grant County, Wisconsin. It flows south, to the east of the Menominee River, into Illinois. It crosses the northwestern corner of Illinois for about six miles before joining the Mississippi at the southern end of East Dubuque. The town of Menominee, Illinois is located on the river.

The name "Menominee" refers to the Menominee, a Native American people. The name means "good seed" or "wild rice".

The river is part of the Driftless Area of Illinois and Wisconsin. This region escaped the glaciation experienced by areas to the east and west during the last ice age.

See also
List of Illinois rivers
List of Wisconsin rivers

References

External links
Prairie Rivers Network

Rivers of Illinois
Rivers of Wisconsin
Tributaries of the Mississippi River
Rivers of Jo Daviess County, Illinois
Driftless Area
Rivers of Grant County, Wisconsin

fr:Liste des fleuves de l'Illinois
nl:Lijst van rivieren in Illinois